Shell House or The Shell House may refer to:

Buildings
 The Shell House, an historic home in Nassau County, New York
 Shell House (Johannesburg), former headquarters of the African National Congress and site of the Shell House massacre
 Shell-Haus, a classical modernist architectural masterwork in the Tiergarten district of Berlin
 Shell House, Brisbane, heritage-listed building in Brisbane, Australia
 Shellhus, the target of the controversial British air raid, Operation Carthage during World War II
 The Shell House, a hexagonal structure in Staunton Country Park
 Shell Mex House in London

Other
 Shell House, an area of coastal cliffs in Mid West Western Australia